George Randall Gibson (October 2, 1905 – August 19, 2004) was an American football player and coach.  He played college football as a guard at the University of Minnesota from 1926 to 1928. He was captain of the 1928 Minnesota Golden Gophers football team and was named to the 1928 College Football All-America Team. Gibson was a teammate and roommate of Bronko Nagurski. The two are jointly honored as the namesakes of the Minnesota Golden Gophers football training complex, the Gibson-Nagurski Football Complex. While at the University of Minnesota, Gibson was a member of Sigma Chi fraternity.

Gibson was a professional player and coach in the early National Football League (NFL). In 1930, Gibson joined the Minneapolis Red Jackets as a player-coach. Later that season, he moved to the Frankford Yellow Jackets. His career NFL coaching record was 3–10–1.

Gibson was one of eleven All-American football players to appear in the 1930 film Maybe It's Love.

After his football career, Gibson earned his Ph.D. in geology from the University of Minnesota and became a geology professor at Carleton College, where he also coached the football team from 1934 to 1938. In 1936, Carleton went 6–1 with the only loss coming to Iowa. His coaching record at Carleton was 21–13–2.

He later moved to Midland, Texas, where he was a geological consultant for oil companies. For his work in the field, Gibson was inducted into the Petroleum Museum Hall of Fame in 2001.

Gibson died at his home in Midland, Texas on August 19, 2004, at the age of 98.

Head coaching record

College

References

External links
 
 

1905 births
2004 deaths
American football guards
Carleton Knights football coaches
Frankford Yellow Jackets coaches
Frankford Yellow Jackets players
Minnesota Golden Gophers football coaches
Minnesota Golden Gophers football players
Minneapolis Red Jackets coaches
Minneapolis Red Jackets players
Carleton College faculty
Player-coaches
People from Romulus, New York